Alan Charles Lovell  (born 19 November 1953) is a British businessman, formerly chief executive of the British construction company Costain, and currently chairman of Interserve.

Early life
Lovell is the son of a farmer, and was educated at Winchester College, followed by a degree in classics from the University of Oxford.

Career
He trained as an accountant with PricewaterhouseCoopers from 1976 to 1980, where he was seconded to the City merchant bank Kleinwort Benson, and then worked for the electronics company Plessey from 1980 to 1989.

In 1989, Lovell joined Conder Group as finance director, rising to CEO, when it collapsed in September 1992. He was finance director of Costain from 1992 to 1995, and its CEO from 1995 to 1997, after which he was FD and CEO of Dunlop Slazenger, and then CEO of Jarvis plc. In July 2006, he was appointed as CEO of Infinis, which then claimed to be the UK's largest independent solely renewable power company.

In November 2017, Lovell joined Carillion as a non-executive director, and was described as a "veteran turnaround specialist", a "turnaround expert" and a "company doctor". Carillion went into liquidation in January 2018.

In July 2019, Lovell was appointed chairman of the financially troubled Interserve group.

Lovell is chairman of Safestyle plc and the Association of Lloyd's Members. He is a non-executive director and senior independent director of SIG plc.

Lovell is a deputy lieutenant of Hampshire, chairman of the Mary Rose Trust, chairman of the board of governors of Winchester University and a trustee of Winchester Cathedral.

Personal life
He is married to Virginia, daughter of the former House of Commons speaker Bernard Weatherill, and they have two daughters.

Lovell has a longstanding interest in tennis, real tennis and rackets from his schooldays, and was head of the UK's real tennis association in Britain for 13 years.

References

Living people
1953 births
Deputy Lieutenants in England
Alumni of the University of Oxford
People educated at Winchester College
British chief executives
Carillion people